Juan Eduardo Simián Gallet (16 November 1915−14 December 1995) was a Chilean footballer and politician who served as minister of State during Eduardo Frei Montalva's government. Simián is considered a historical player of Club Universidad de Chile.

Football career

Club career
Simián began his career at Club Universidad de Chile aged 20 while he was doing his BA in mining engineering at the University of Chile, where he graduated in 1938.

During the 1938 Primera División de Chile season, he was part of the Universidad de Chile champion team which obtained the First Division title under the orders of the player-coach Luis Tirado. Simian's impressive performances led the press to consider him as one of the best players of early Chilean football.

In 1940, Simián stopped his football career after obtaining a scholarship from the Production Development Corporation (Corfo) to research in the US on geological exploration, geophysics, and drilling of exploration wells. Once ended his spell in the US, in 1942, he returned to play in Universidad de Chile, but only during that single-season.

In 1946, Simián definitely retired from football aged 31 after playing another entire season with Universidad de Chile after four years.

International career
He played in three matches for the Chile national football team in 1939. He was also part of Chile's squad for the 1939 South American Championship.

Political career

Beginnings at ENAP
After his experience in the US, the Corfo hired him in the early-1940s to plan operations in southern Chile. As head of the drilling team, on 29 September 1945, Simián participated in the discovery of the first oil well in the Magallanes Region.

In 1950, the president Gabriel González Videla –from the Radical Party (PR)– appointed him as the production manager of the state-owned company Empresa Nacional del Petróleo (ENAP).

1958 parliamentary campaign
In 1958, Simián failed to reach a seat in the Senate after losing the elections of the 8th District of San Miguel. During his campaign, he was supported by Sergio Livingstone.

Minister of Mining
In 1964, the elected president Eduardo Frei Montalva called him to serve as Minister of Mining, an office he accepted and served until 1966.

During Simián's administration occurred the first stage of the Chilean nationalization of copper. The official initiative –also known as 'agreed nationalization'– was sent by Frei to the National Congress in September 1965. After an arduous debate, the text was approved in January 1966, giving rise to Law N°16.425 and the creation of the Chilean Copper Corporation, the seed of Codelco (National Copper Corporation of Chile). Similarly, in 1966, was enacted Law N°16.624. It created mixed companies owned in a 51% by the Chilean State.

Late career
In 1973, he become the ENAP general manager.

In 1988, he was one of the founders of the political movement Independientes por el Consenso Democrático.

References

Works cited

External links
 

1915 births
1995 deaths
Chilean footballers
Chile international footballers
University of Chile alumni
Universidad de Chile footballers
Christian Democratic Party (Chile) politicians
Chilean Ministers of Mining
Association football goalkeepers